Willie "Bill" Simms (December 23, 1908 – May 10, 2002) was an American baseball outfielder in the Negro leagues. He played from 1937 to 1944 with several teams.

References

External links
 and Baseball-Reference Black Baseball stats and Seamheads
NLB Museum

1908 births
2002 deaths
Kansas City Monarchs players
Atlanta Black Crackers players
Chicago American Giants players
Baseball players from Shreveport, Louisiana
People from Perris, California
20th-century African-American sportspeople
Baseball outfielders
21st-century African-American people